ABCL can refer to

 Actor-Based Concurrent Language
 American Birth Control League
 Amitabh Bachchan Corporation
 Armed Bear Common Lisp
 Automatic Barrier Crossing Locally monitored, a type of level crossing in the United Kingdom

See also
 ACBL (disambiguation)